Chugchilán is a town in Sigchos Canton, Cotopaxi Province, Ecuador. It has a population of 6,350.

References 

Populated places in Cotopaxi Province